Umarkhed Assembly constituency is one of the 288 constituencies of the Maharashtra Vidhan Sabha and one of the seven which are located in the Yavatmal district of the Indian state of Maharashtra. It is reserved for Scheduled Caste candidate.

It is a part of the Hingoli (Lok Sabha constituency) along with five other Vidhan Sabha constituencies, viz Basmath, Kalamnuri and Hingoli from Hingoli district and Kinwat and Hadgaon from Nanded district.

The remaining constituencies from Yavatmal district, Ralegaon(ST), Yavatmal(ST), Digras and Pusad are part of Yavatmal-Washim (Lok Sabha constituency) while Wani and Arni(SC) are part of Chandrapur (Lok Sabha constituency).

Members of Legislative assembly

Notes

Assembly constituencies of Maharashtra